Bati Youth Football Academy (Khmer: សាលាបាល់ទាត់ជាតិយុវជនបាទី) also known as the National Football Academy or Bati Academy is an under-18 football team operated by the FFC (Football Federation of Cambodia). The team was invited to compete in the 2019 Cambodian League as a project to expose younger players to higher level of competitions in order to compete in various international competitions such as the SEA Games.

References

Football clubs in Cambodia
Sport in Phnom Penh